The Moroccan Throne Cup (in French: Coupe du Trône) is the national cup competition for professional basketball teams in Morocco. The competition was established in 1957.

AS Salé holds the record for most cups won with 11.

Champions

Performance by club

References

Basketball competitions in Morocco